The 2016–17 season was Cheltenham Town's 130th season of existence and their first back in League Two after gaining promotion the previous season. Along with competing in League Two, the club participated in the FA Cup, League Cup and Football League Trophy.

The season covered the period from 1 July 2016 to 30 June 2017.

Transfers

In

Out

Loans in

Loans out

Competitions

Pre-season friendlies

League Two

League table

Matches

FA Cup

EFL Cup

EFL Trophy

Squad statistics
Source:

Numbers in parentheses denote appearances as substitute.
Players with squad numbers struck through and marked  left the club during the playing season.
Players with names in italics and marked * were on loan from another club for the whole of their season with Cheltenham.
Players listed with no appearances have been in the matchday squad but only as unused substitutes.
Key to positions: GK – Goalkeeper; DF – Defender; MF – Midfielder; FW – Forward

References

Cheltenham Town
Cheltenham Town F.C. seasons